The Malta Tramways Ltd company operated electric tramways in Malta from 23 February 1905 till 1929. A legal trailer was founded in 1903 by the Society. It was handled by a meter-wide track. Drive along the Bilevel rail car, the side and on top of the Oberdeck open.

The tramway was connected with two lines, considered to be a direct line:
 Valletta – Marsa – Paola – Cospicua
 Valletta – Ħamrun – Qormi – Żebbuġ
 Valletta – Ħamrun – Birkirkara
There was no immediate extension of the track to Mosta.

The tracks ran on the road parallel to the Valletta-Mdina railway line, which allowed the traffic system to be used by cars and buses in the ruin. The road operation was terminated after the bankruptcy of the company on December 15, 1929 and the infrastructure was rebuilt.

In 2008, the Halcrow report suggested the government to reintroduce two tram lines in Malta: Valletta to Sliema along the coast road, and Valletta to Ta' Qali. The report was largely overlooked, as the government focused on reforming the bus transport. In 2016 the government announced a new study on reintroducing the tram. The new study, which is expected by late 2020, should also look at metro and monorail options.

Notes

External links

 Simonds Family, the Maltese Brewery
 Tramway Info

 
Tram transport in Europe
1905 establishments in Malta
1929 disestablishments in Malta